Chelatococcus reniformis is a Gram-negative and non-motile bacterium from the genus of Chelatococcus which has been isolated from the Muztagh Glacier on the Tibetan Plateau in China.

References

External links
Type strain of Chelatococcus reniformis at BacDive -  the Bacterial Diversity Metadatabase

Hyphomicrobiales
Bacteria described in 2016